The white-whiskered puffbird (Malacoptila panamensis), also called the white-whiskered soft-wing or brown puffbird, is a near-passerine bird in the family Bucconidae, the puffbirds, nunlets, and nunbirds. It is found from southeastern Mexico through Central America (except El Salvador), Colombia, and Ecuador into Peru.

Taxonomy and systematics

The white-whiskered puffbird has these four subspecies:

M. p. inornata du Bus de Gisignies (1847)
M. p. panamensis Lafresnaye (1847)
M. p. magdalenae Todd (1943)
M. p. poliopsis Sclater (1862)

It is thought to form a superspecies with the moustached puffbird (M. mystacalis) and black-streaked puffbird (M. fulvogularis).

Description

Unlike most puffbirds, the male and female have different plumages. Both sexes have bristles around the base of the large bill, and white "whiskers", which are actually tufts of feathers. The nominate adult male's upperparts are brown to chestnut brown. The forecrown has narrow buff or tawny streaks and most of the rest of the upperparts have buff or tawny spots. The tail is chesnut brown. Its lores, supercilium, cheeks, and the sides of the neck are tawny. The throat and upper breast are tawny to tawny buff and the rest of the underparts are buffy white with darker streaks on the breast and flanks. The adult female has less of a chesnut cast; its crown is grayer and its upperparts olive to brown. Most of the underparts are buff to cinnamon-buff with darker streaks; the abdomen is white. Juveniles are like the female but with heavier streaking on the underparts. The subspecies are all similar to the nominate, differing mainly in the shades of gray, brown, and rufous and in the density of the streaking.

Distribution and habitat

The subspecies of white-whiskered puffbird are distributed thus:

M. p. inornata, the Caribbean slope from southeastern Mexico through Belize, Guatemala, Nicaragua, and Costa Rica into western Panama.
M. p. panamensis, the Pacific slope from southwestern Costa Rica through Panama into northwestern Colombia
M. p. magdalenae, the Magdalena River valley of west-central Colombia
M. p. poliopsis, southwestern Colombia through western Ecuador into extreme northwestern Peru

The species mostly inhabits dense primary evergreen forest though it is also found in secondary forest and in shorter vegetation around the edges of fields. It typically remains fairly low, within  of the ground.

Behavior

Feeding

Like other puffbirds, the white-whiskered puffbird hunts by a watch-and-wait technique, sitting motionless before darting to catch large invertebrates and small vertebrates such as frogs and lizards. The prey is taken back to the perch and beaten against it prior to consumption. It has also been recorded following army ant swarms and joining mixed-species foraging flocks.

Breeding

Almost all of the data on the white-whiskered puffbird's breeding phenology comes from Costa Rica. The breeding season there spans from mid-March into July. The wider nesting chamber is lined with dried leaves. The female lays two, rarely three, glossy white eggs. Both sexes incubate the eggs.

Vocalization

The white-whiskered puffbird's song is "a high-pitched descending trill ... usually with an emphasized note at the end, e.g., tssiirrrrr-tsít." It sings less often than many other puffbirds. A frequently heard call is "a high, thin, slightly reedy, drawn-out tsssiiiw or tssssiiir, fading away".

Status

The IUCN has assessed the white-whiskered puffbird as being of Least Concern. It has a very large range and an estimated population of at least 50,000 mature individuals, though the latter is believed to be decreasing. It "is vulnerable to habitat loss through deforestation [but] can occupy advanced second growth".

References

External links
White-whiskered puffbird photo gallery VIREO

Malacoptila
Birds of Central America
Birds of Mexico
Birds of Colombia
Birds of Ecuador
Birds described in 1847